Pastura can refer to:

Pastura, New Mexico
Antonio del Massaro, or Antonio da Viterbo, nicknamed il Pastura  (ca. 1450–1516), an Italian painter.